Eriochilus cucullatus, commonly known as parson's bands, or leafless parson's bands, is a plant in the orchid family Orchidaceae and is endemic to Australia. It is a common and widespread, slender ground orchid with a single leaf and up to five small white to pale pink flowers. It grows in all Australian states except Western Australia and the Northern Territory.

Description
Eriochilus cucullatus is a terrestrial,  perennial, deciduous, herb with an underground tuber. Flowering occurs from December to June.

Taxonomy and naming
This orchid was first formally described in 1805 by Jacques Labillardière who gave it the name Epipactis cucullata and published the description in Novae Hollandiae Plantarum Specimen. In 1871 Heinrich Reichenbach changed the name to Eriochilus cucullatus. The specific epithet (cucullatus) is a Latin word meaning "hooded" and the common name, "parson's bands" refers to the white (or pink) lateral sepals resembling a clerical collar.

Distribution and habitat
Parson's bands is widespread in Tasmania, in Victoria apart from the far north-west, eastern New South Wales as far west as Grenfell, south-east Queensland and south-east South Australia. It grows in a wide range of habitats, from grassland to forest and from coastal areas to subalpine zones.

Use in horticulture
Eriochilus cucullatus is sometimes grown in pots by orchid enthusiasts but requires specialist techniques.

References 

cucullatus
Plants described in 1805
Endemic orchids of Australia
Orchids of Australia